Julián Alejandro Legaspi Oxandabarat (born 10 July 1973 in Montevideo) is a Uruguayan-Peruvian actor.

He became famous for his role in the miniseries El ángel vengador: Calígula.

Televisión

 El ángel vengador: Calígula (1993) as Alejandro Samanéz "Calígula".
 Los de arriba y los de abajo (1994) as Cesar Valencia
 Malicia (1995) as Carlos Figari.
Cuando los ángeles lloran  (1995)
 La noche (1996) as Orlando Molina.
 Boulevard Torbellino (1997) as Carlo Del Campo.
 Secretos (1998) as Alberto Costa.
 Isabella, mujer enamorada (1999) as Sebastián Revilla.
 Pobre diabla (2000) as Luis Alberto Miller de las Casas.
 Soledad (2001) 
 Luciana y Nicolás (2003) as Renato Echevarría.
 Besos robados (2004) as Samuel Lang.
 Así es la vida (2005) as Ricardo Mendoza Berckemeyer.
 Decisiones (2006), episode "Una luz al final del camino".
 Amores como el nuestro (2006) as Lenín Armas. 
 Las dos caras de Ana (2006–07) as Javier Gardel.
 Los exitosos Gome$ (2010) as Ricardo Catalano.
 El enano (2010) as Fausto Mendieta.
 Ana Cristina (2011) as Andrés "Andrew" Gamio.
 Corazón de fuego (2011–12) as Vasco Suárez.
 Solamente milagros (2013), 1 episode as Santiago.
 Derecho de familia (2013), 1 episode as Gustavo.
 Camino a la gloria
 Ciro. El Angel del Colca  (2014)
 Historias Reales- El Aborto (2015)
 Al fondo hay sitio (2015) as Ángel 
Mi Esperanza (2018) as Anibal Gutierrez Ponce

Films
 Yuli (2018) as Cyborg

References

External links
 

1973 births
Male actors from Montevideo
Uruguayan people of Peruvian descent
Uruguayan people of Basque descent
Peruvian people of Basque descent
Peruvian people of Uruguayan descent
Uruguayan emigrants to Peru
Peruvian male television actors
Peruvian male film actors
Living people